Wesley Patrick Hoolahan (born 20 May 1982) is an Irish professional footballer who most recently played as an attacking midfielder for League One club Cambridge United.

Hoolahan began his playing career with Shelbourne and has previously played for Livingston, Blackpool, West Bromwich Albion, Newcastle Jets and had a 10-year stay at Norwich City. He was the subject of a contested transfer between Livingston and Blackpool in 2007, eventually requiring mediation by FIFA before he was able to sign for Blackpool. Hoolahan played more than 350 games for Norwich, where he earned nicknames like "The Irish Messi" or Wessi.

Hoolahan made his Republic of Ireland senior debut in 2008 in a 1–0 win over Colombia. He represented Ireland at UEFA Euro 2016. Hoolahan won 43 caps in total and scored 3 goals.

Club career

Early career
Hoolahan played as a schoolboy for Belvedere. He also played futsal with Belvedere. He started his senior career at Shelbourne where he won three League of Ireland Premier Division championships and excelled during their run in the 2004–05 UEFA Champions League qualifying rounds. He was the PFAI Young Player of the Year in the 2002–03 season. He then had a brief spell at Livingston.

Blackpool
On 21 July 2006, Hoolahan joined Blackpool on a season-long loan. He scored his first goal for the club on 30 September 2006, a penalty in a 3–0 win over Leyton Orient at Bloomfield Road. On 15 December 2006, he scored a goal and was sent off in a 3–1 win at Scunthorpe United.

In June 2007, Hoolahan signed a two-year contract with Blackpool. Livingston, however, refused to sign the documentation sanctioning the move, stating that Blackpool had repeatedly breached the terms of the loan agreement. Blackpool denied any such default and referred the matter to the Football Association. With Livingston being backed by the Scottish Football Association the matter was passed to FIFA for a decision to be made on the player's future. On 10 August 2007, FIFA ruled in Blackpool's favour, thus confirming Hoolahan as a Blackpool player.

Norwich City

On 26 June 2008, Norwich City confirmed the deal to bring Hoolahan on a three-year player-plus-cash deal. Norwich reserve team keeper Matt Gilks moved in the opposite direction along with an undisclosed amount of money. Hoolahan was handed squad number 14, which he retained in his time at Norwich. His first goal for the club finally came when he opened the scoring in a 4–0 win over Barnsley at Carrow Road on 17 January 2009. An injury sustained on 14 March, whilst playing against Plymouth Argyle, kept him out for the rest of the season as Norwich were ultimately relegated to League One.

In 2009–10, under new manager Paul Lambert, Hoolahan was utilised in a role behind the strikers in a midfield diamond formation as opposed to on the wing. This saw a higher personal goal return for Hoolahan as he scored 13 times (including four penalties) in all competitions before the new year.

In the 2010–11 season, Hoolahan scored his first two goals of the season against Leicester City, scoring a penalty and a 30-yard half-volley shot. Like the previous season, Hoolahan was utilised at the tip of the diamond formation. Hoolahan continued his good form, with a goal against Bristol City, making it three goals in two matches for him. On 28 December 2010, Hoolahan scored his first hat-trick for Norwich City in a 4–2 win over Sheffield United after coming on as a substitute.

Hoolahan signed a new three-and-a-half-year deal with the club in January 2011, committing his future to Norwich until 2014.

During pre-season before the 2011–12 Premier League campaign, Hoolahan was given the captain's armband when club captain Grant Holt and vice-captain Russell Martin were not playing. He led out the Canaries for the first time in the friendly fixture against Southend United at Roots Hall. He scored his first Premier League goal in Norwich City's opening day 1–1 draw against Wigan Athletic on 13 August 2011. Hoolahan led the Norwich team out as captain for their first Premier League win of the season, a 2–1 away victory against Bolton Wanderers on 17 September 2011, being given the armband ahead of the previous season's regular vice-captain Russell Martin who was also in the team. He was inducted into Norwich City's Hall of Fame on 20 March 2012.

On 15 December 2012, it was announced that Hoolahan had signed a new deal with Norwich City worth a reported £40,000 per week, keeping him at the club until 2015.

In January 2014, Hoolahan was the subject of transfer speculation from Aston Villa who reportedly had a bid of £1 million rejected. A few days after this reported bid, Hoolahan put in a transfer request which was turned down by the club. On 7 March, Hoolahan scored the opening goal against Villa in a 4–1 defeat, and executed a muted celebration.

In August 2014, Hoolahan signed a new contract to keep him at the club until the end of the 2016–17 season.

On 19 April 2015, Hoolahan was selected in the Football Manager Team of the Decade at the Football League Awards. Hoolahan made 32 appearances for Norwich in the 2015–16 season, scoring four goals, as the Canaries were relegated from the Premier League.

On 1 August 2016, Hoolahan agreed a new contract to keep him at Norwich City until 2018. He made his 300th Norwich appearance on 5 November 2016 in a 3–2 home defeat against Leeds United. On 7 May 2017, Hoolahan was announced as Norwich City's Player of the Season for 2016–17. In the last match of the season on 7 May 2017, Hoolahan scored two goals and registered an assist against Queens Park Rangers. He made 33 appearances in 2016–17, all of which came in the league, and scored seven goals.

On 23 April 2018, it was announced that Hoolahan would be leaving at the end of the season after being with the club for 10 years. Five days later, Hoolahan played in his last home match for Norwich City against Leeds United where he was given a guard of honour by both sets of players. As this was his last home appearance, he was rewarded with the captain's armband. Hoolahan scored his first league goal of the season and assisted the goal for Josh Murphy as Norwich won the match 2–1.

West Bromwich Albion
On 14 September 2018, Hoolahan signed for West Bromwich Albion on a short-term deal. Four days later, Hoolahan made his Albion debut in a 4–2 win against Bristol City as a 74th-minute substitute. Despite not starting a league game for Albion since joining in September, on 1 February 2019 Hoolahan's deal was extended until the end of the 2018–19 season. He was released by Albion at the end of the season.

Newcastle Jets
On 9 August 2019, Hoolahan signed a one-year deal with Newcastle Jets for the upcoming 2019–20 A-League season. However he suffered a serious ankle injury ahead of the season and consequently did not make his first appearance for them until a 1–1 draw at home to Melbourne Victory in February 2020. He would ultimately only make five appearances for the side.

Cambridge United
Hoolahan joined League Two club Cambridge United on 28 July 2020 on a one-year deal. Hoolahan was named the League Two Player of the Month for the month of January 2021 after registering two goals and two assists and helping Cambridge climb to first in the league table.

In April 2021, he was named on the EFL League Two Team of the Season and was nominated for the EFL League Two Player of the Season. The award was won by Hoolahan's team-mate Paul Mullin. On 2 June 2021, following promotion from League Two, Hoolahan signed a new one-year extension with the club, taking him through to the end of the 2021–22 season.
On 3 May 2022, it was announced Hoolahan had been released by the club.

International career
Hoolahan was first capped at under-21 level for the Republic of Ireland. While at Shelbourne, he was an unused substitute in Don Givens' first game in charge of the Republic of Ireland, a 0–0 draw against Greece in November 2002.

Hoolahan was named in the Republic of Ireland "B" squad on 8 November 2007, for the match against Scotland on 20 November at the Excelsior Stadium in Airdrie. Hoolahan played in the match, which ended in a 1–1 draw.

In April 2008, Giovanni Trapattoni included Hoolahan in his preliminary 40-man squad for the friendly matches against Serbia on 24 May and Colombia on 29 May. On 13 May, it was confirmed that Hoolahan had made the 28-man squad and that he would be joining a training camp in Portugal on 15 May in preparation for the matches. He came on as a 70th-minute substitute in a practice match which the Irish team drew 1–1 with Portuguese Liga de Honra club side Portimonense. He was an unused substitute in Ireland's 1–1 draw with Serbia at Croke Park in Dublin. On 29 May, he came on as a second-half substitute in the 1–0 win over Colombia held in England at Craven Cottage.

On 10 August 2012, Hoolahan was recalled to the Republic of Ireland squad for 15 August friendly international against Serbia in Belgrade. However, he was unable to accept the call due to an Achilles tendon injury.

On 31 October 2012, Hoolahan was called up to the Republic of Ireland squad for the 14 November friendly international against Greece in Dublin. He came on at half-time in the 1–0 defeat replacing Robbie Brady and earning his second cap for the Republic of Ireland. On 6 February 2013, Hoolahan scored his first goal for Ireland in a 2–0 defeat of Poland in a friendly in Dublin.

After being rarely used during the Trappatoni era, Hoolahan was selected for Martin O'Neill's first game as Irish manager against Latvia. Ireland won the game 3–0. Hoolahan flourished under O'Neill, picking up the Man of the Match awards against Serbia and Turkey. Former Norwich City teammate Anthony Pilkington called for O'Neill to build the team around Hoolahan for the Euro 2016 qualifiers.

On 11 October 2014, despite not being used in the first qualifying game against Georgia, O'Neill restored Hoolahan to the starting 11 against the minnows Gibraltar. Hoolahan was heavily involved in the game with his sublime ball finding Aiden McGeady who crossed to Robbie Keane who made it 1–0. He then assisted Keane for the second goal and won the penalty which Keane converted to make it 3–0. Hoolahan scored the 7th goal which rounded off the rout and he also picked up the Man of the Match award for his brilliant performance.

On 29 March 2015, Hoolahan started Ireland's crucial Euro 2016 qualifier against Poland in the Aviva Stadium. The game finished 1–1 with Hoolahan getting the assist for Shane Long's injury-time equaliser. Hoolahan picked up the Man of the Match award with Johnny Giles and Eamon Dunphy praising his performance.

Hoolahan scored the first goal for Ireland at UEFA Euro 2016 in Ireland's opening group stage match against Sweden. He earned the Man of the Match award for his display in an eventual 1–1 draw. On 22 June 2016, Hoolahan came on as a substitute for James McCarthy in the 77th minute in Ireland's final Euro 2016 group game against Italy. He provided the assist for Robbie Brady's 85th-minute winner to send the Republic of Ireland through to the last 16. Moments prior to the goal, Hoolahan had had a great one-on-one chance which was saved by the Italian goalkeeper Salvatore Sirigu. On 8 February 2018, Hoolahan announced his retirement from international football.

Career statistics

Club

International

Scores and results list the Republic of Ireland's goal tally first, score column indicates score after each Hoolahan goal.

Honours
Shelbourne
League of Ireland Premier Division: 2001–02, 2003, 2004

Blackpool
Football League One play-offs: 2007

Norwich City
Football League One: 2009–10
Football League Championship runner-up: 2010–11
Football League Championship play-offs: 2015

Cambridge United
Football League Two runner-up: 2020–21

Individual
PFAI Young Player of the Year: 2002–03
PFA Team of the Year: 2006–07 League One, 2009–10 League One, 2010–11 Championship, 2020–21 League Two
The Football League Team of the Decade
Norwich City Player of the Season: 2016–17
League Two Player of the Month: January 2021
 EFL League Two Team of the Season: 2020–21

References

External links

 Wes Hoolahan profile at Norwich City F.C.

"Wesley Hoolahan" by Phillip Quinn
Ireland stats at 11v11

1982 births
Living people
Association footballers from Dublin (city)
Republic of Ireland association footballers
Republic of Ireland under-21 international footballers
Republic of Ireland B international footballers
Republic of Ireland international footballers
Association football midfielders
Belvedere F.C. players
Shelbourne F.C. players
Livingston F.C. players
Blackpool F.C. players
Norwich City F.C. players
West Bromwich Albion F.C. players
Newcastle Jets FC players
Cambridge United F.C. players
League of Ireland players
Scottish Premier League players
English Football League players
Premier League players
UEFA Euro 2016 players
Republic of Ireland men's futsal players
Irish expatriate association footballers
Expatriate soccer players in Australia